Diribe Welteji Kejelcha (born 13 May 2002) is an Ethiopian middle-distance runner. She placed fourth in the 800 metres at the 2022 World Athletics Championships.

At age 16, Welteji won the 800 m at the 2018 World U20 Championships, breaking the championship record in the process. She took silver for the 1500 metres at the 2021 World U20 Championships.

Career
A 16-year-old Diribe Welteji won the gold medal for the 800 m event at the 2018 World Under-20 Championships in Tampere, where she also competed in the women's 4 × 400 m relay without reaching the final, but achieving an Ethiopian junior record.

In 2019, she won a gold in the 1500 metres at the African U20 Championships, finished sixth in the 800 m event at the African Games in Rabat, and was eliminated in the semi-finals of the 800 m event at the Doha World Championships.

The 19-year-old competed without success in the women's 1500 m at the delayed 2020 Tokyo Olympics in 2021, but took silver in this event at the World U20 Championships held in Nairobi.

Welteji placed fourth in the 800 m at the 2022 World Athletics Championships in Eugene, Oregon in July with a time of 1:57.02. On 6 August, she won her first Diamond League meeting, setting in the 1500m a personal best and meet record of 3:56.91 at the Kamila Skolimowska Memorial in Chorzów; she finished ahead of her compatriot Gudaf Tsegay.

Achievements

International competitions

Circuit wins
 Diamond League
 2022: Chorzów Kamila Skolimowska Memorial (1500m)

Personal bests
 800 metres – 1:57.02 (Eugene, OR July 2022)
 1500 metres – 3:56.91 (Chorzów August 2022)
 3000 metres indoor – 8:33.44 (Val-de-Reuil February 2023)

References

2002 births
Living people
Ethiopian female middle-distance runners
Athletes (track and field) at the 2019 African Games
African Games competitors for Ethiopia
Athletes (track and field) at the 2020 Summer Olympics
Olympic athletes of Ethiopia
21st-century Ethiopian women